Last Kings Records is an independent record label. It was founded by American recording artist Tyga in 2015 after a dispute with his former label, Cash Money Records. In 2017, Tyga signed a multi-million dollar deal with EMPIRE to distribute the label's music. After releasing his seventh studio album Legendary, he signed a distribution deal with Columbia Records. The label's logo is a tribute to the logo of Death Row Records.

Discography

Studio albums
List of album releases under Last Kings Records.

Mixtapes

References

External links

Record labels established in 2015
Vanity record labels
2015 establishments in the United States